The 1989–90 NCAA football bowl games were a series of post-season games played in December 1989 and January 1990 to end the 1989 NCAA Division I-A football season. A total of 18 team-competitive games, and two all-star games, were played. The post-season began with the California Bowl on December 9, 1989, and concluded on January 20, 1990, with the season-ending Senior Bowl.

Schedule

References